Working Mom is a 2008 South Korean television drama directed by Oh Jong-rok starring Yum Jung-ah, Bong Tae-gyu, Cha Ye-ryun and Ryu Tae-joon. It aired on SBS from July 30 to September 18, 2008 on Wednesdays and Thursdays at 21:55 for 16 episodes.

Plot
Working Mom revolves around the many difficult choices and tradeoffs working women make as they juggle career and family. Choi Ga-young is a successful career woman whose life turns upside down when she accidentally becomes pregnant with the child of her younger co-worker, the troubled but charming Park Jae-sung. Suddenly, she finds herself transformed into a full-time mom dealing with two rowdy little boys.

Determined to return to her glory days, Ga-young decides to start working again, but she has to leave her kids with someone. It would have been her mother, but she died a few years ago and now the only way is to persuade her father to get married again. At first, everything seems to be going smoothly, until Ga-young's plan takes a turn when her new stepmother refuses to take care of her step-grandsons. Thus, Ga-young's quest to win back her job and her husband (who is secretly having an affair with his colleague) begins.

Cast

Main characters
Yum Jung-ah as Choi Ga-young
Bong Tae-gyu as Park Jae-sung
Cha Ye-ryun as Go Eun-ji
Ryu Tae-joon as Ha Jung-won

Supporting characters
Kim Ja-ok as Kim Bok-sil
Yoon Joo-sang as Choi Jong-man
Im Dae-ho as Go Joo-mong
Hong Su-min as Jung Hyun-joo
Noh Jung-woong as Park Ji-ho
Jung Tae-won as Park Ji-min
Kim Ji-young as Ahn Heung-boon
Lee Sung-min as Kang Chul-min
Kwon Se-in as Park In-seong
Jung Suk-won as Swimming pool lifeguard
Kim Ga-yeon as Park In-hye
Jung Hyo-eun as Kang Soo-bin
Lee Eun-soo as Kang Won-jae
Ha Jae-young as Jang Kyung-tae
Lee Seung-hyung as Lee Bang-won

Original soundtrack

Awards and nominations

References

External links
 Working Mom official SBS website 
 

2008 South Korean television series debuts
2008 South Korean television series endings
Seoul Broadcasting System television dramas
Korean-language television shows
South Korean romantic comedy television series
Television series by JS Pictures